Bael Bael is a locality located in the Shire of Gannawarra of Victoria. It contains Lake Bael Bael and the heritage listed Bael Bael Homestead.

See also
List of reduplicated Australian place names

References